Afforestation is the establishment of a forest or stand of trees (forestation) in an area where there was no previous tree cover. Many government and non-governmental organizations directly engage in afforestation programs to create forests and increase carbon capture. Afforestation is an increasingly sought-after method to fight climate concerns, as it is known to increase the soil quality and organic carbon levels into the soil, avoiding desertification. Afforestation is mainly done for conservational and commercial purposes.

The rate of net forest loss decreased substantially over the period 1990–2020 due to a reduction in deforestation in some countries, plus increases in forest area in others through afforestation and the natural expansion of forests. A 2019 study of the global potential for tree restoration showed that there is space for at least 9 million km2 of new forests worldwide, which is a 25% increase from current conditions. This forested area could store up to 205 gigatons of carbon or 25% of the atmosphere's current carbon pool by reducing  in the atmosphere and introducing more O2.

Procedure 
The process of afforestation begins with site selection. Several environmental factors of the site must be analyzed, including climate, soil, vegetation, and human activity. These factors will determine the quality of the site, what species of trees should be planted, and what planting method should be used.

After the forest site has been assessed, the area must be prepared for planting. Preparation can involve a variety of mechanical or chemical methods, such as chopping, mounding, bedding, herbicides, and prescribed burning. Once the site is prepared, planting can take place. One method for planting is direct seeding, which involves sowing seeds directly into the forest floor. Another is seedling planting, which is similar to direct seeding except that seedlings already have an established root system. Afforestation by cutting is an option for tree species that can reproduce asexually, where a piece of a tree stem, branch, root, or leaves can be planted onto the forest floor and sprout successfully. Sometimes special tools, such as a tree planting bar, are used to make planting of trees easier and faster.

Countries and regions

Australia

In Adelaide, South Australia (a city of 1.3 million as of June 2016), Premier Mike Rann (2002 to 2011) launched an urban forest initiative in 2003 to plant 3 million native trees and shrubs by 2014 on 300 project sites across the metro area. Thousands of Adelaide citizens have participated in community planting days on sites including parks, reserves, transport corridors, schools, water courses and coastline. Only native trees were planted to ensure genetic integrity. He said the project aimed to beautify and cool the city and make it more livable, improve air and water quality, and reduce Adelaide's greenhouse gas emissions by 600,000 tonnes of  a year.

Canada
In 2003, the government of Canada created a four-year project called the Forest 2020 Plantation Development and Assessment Initiative, which involved planting 6000 ha of fast-growing forests on non-forested lands countrywide. These plantations were used to analyze how afforestation can help to increase carbon sequestration and mitigate greenhouse gas (GHG) emissions while also considering the economic and investment attractiveness of afforestation. The results of the initiative showed that although there is not enough available land in Canada to completely offset the country's GHG emissions, afforestation can be useful mitigation technique for meeting GHG emission goals, especially until permanent, more advanced carbon storage technology becomes available.

On December 14, 2020, Canada's Minister of Natural Resources Seamus O'Regan announced the federal government's investment of $3.16 billion to plant two billion trees over the next 10 years. This plan aims to reduce greenhouse gas emissions by an estimated 12 megatonnes by 2050.

China

A law promulgated in 1981 requires that every school student over the age of 11 plants at least one tree per year. As a result, China has the highest afforestation rate of any country or region in the world, with 47,000 square kilometers of afforestation in 2008. However, the forest area per capita is still far lower than the international average. According to Carbon Brief, China planted the largest amount of new forest out of any country between 1990 and 2015, facilitated by the country's Grain for Green program started in 1999, by investing more than $100 billion in afforestation programs and planting more than 35 billion trees across 12 provinces. By 2015, the amount of planted forest in China covered 79 million hectares.

From 2011 to 2016, the city Dongying in Shandong province forested over 13,800 hectares of saline soil through the Shandong Ecological Afforestation Project, which was launched with support from the World Bank. In 2017, the Saihanba Afforestation Community won the UN Champions of the Earth Award in the Inspiration and Action category for "transforming degraded land into a lush paradise".

Europe

Europe has deforested the majority of its historical forests. The European Union (EU) has paid farmers for afforestation since 1990, offering grants to turn farmland into forest and payments for the management of forest. An EU program, running between 2000 and 2006, afforested more than 1,000 square kilometres of land (precise statistics not yet available). Another such program began in 2007. Europe's forests are growing by 8,000 square kilometres a year thanks to these programmes.

According to Food and Agriculture Organization statistics, Spain had the third fastest afforestation rate in Europe in the 1990-2005 period, after Iceland and Ireland. In those years, a total of 44,360 square kilometers were afforested, and the total forest cover rose from 13.5 to 17.9 million hectares. In 1990, forests covered 26.6% of the Spanish territory. As of 2007, that figure had risen to 36.6%. Spain today has the fifth largest forest area in the European Union.

In January 2013, the UK government set a target of 12% woodland cover in England by 2060, up from the then 10%. In Wales the National Assembly for Wales has set a target of 19% woodland cover, up from 15%. Government-backed initiatives such as the Woodland Carbon Code are intended to support this objective by encouraging corporations and landowners to create new woodland to offset their carbon emissions. Charitable groups such as Trees for Life (Scotland) also contribute to afforestation and reforestation efforts in the UK.

India

23% of India is covered by forest. In 2018, the total forest and tree cover in India increased to 24.39% or 8,020. 88 km2. The forests of India are grouped into 5 major categories and 16 types based on biophysical criteria. 38% of the forest is categorized as subtropical dry deciduous and 30% as tropical moist deciduous and other smaller groups. Only local species are planted in an area. Trees bearing fruits are preferred wherever possible due to their function as a food source.

In 2019, Indians Planted 220 Million trees in a Single day in the Indian state of Uttar Pradesh.

On Thursday, 29 August 2019, Prime Minister of India Mr. Narendra Modi released ₹47, 436 crores (over 6.6 Billion USD) to various states for compulsory afforestation activities. The funds can be used for treatment of catchment areas, assisted natural generation, forest management, wildlife protection and management, relocation of villages from protected areas, managing human-wildlife conflicts, training and awareness generation, supply of wood saving devices and allied activities. Increasing the tree cover would help in creating additional carbon sink to meet the nation's Intended Nationally Determined Contribution (INDC) of 2.5 to 3 billion tonnes of carbon dioxide equivalent through additional forest and tree cover by 2030 - part of India's efforts to combat climate change. The Maharashtra government planted almost 20,000,000 saplings in the entire state, and will pledge to plant another 30,000,000 next year. According to The Telegraph, the Indian government has attributed $6.2 billion for tree-planting in order to increase “forestation in line with agreements made at the Paris climate change summit in 2015.” The Indian government has also passed the CAMPA (Compensatory Afforestation Fund Management and Planning Authority) law, which will allow about 40 thousand crores rupees (almost $6 Billion) will go to Indian states for planting trees.

Iran

Iran is considered a low forest cover region of the world with present cover approximating seven percent of the land area. This is a value reduced to an estimated six million hectares of virgin forest, which includes oak, almond and pistachio. Due to soil substrates, it is difficult to achieve afforestation on a large scale compared to other temperate areas endowed with more fertile and less rocky and arid soil condition. According to the specific statistics of the Forests, Rangelands and Watershed Management Organization of Iran, every year, using appropriate methods and native tree species in each region, a lot of afforestation has been done, which has resulted in more natural stability.

Israel

With over 240 million planted trees, Israel is one of only two countries that entered the 21st century with a net gain in the number of trees, due to massive afforestation efforts. Most Israeli forests are the product of a major afforestation campaign by the Jewish National Fund (JNF).

North Africa

Many African countries that border the Sahara desert are cooperating with the Great Green Wall project. The $8-billion project intends to restore 100 million hectares of degraded land by 2030. Also in North Africa, the Sahara Forest Project coupled with the Seawater greenhouse has been proposed. Some projects have also been launched in countries as Senegal to revert desertification. As of 2010, African leaders are discussing the combining of national resources to increase effectiveness. In addition, other projects as the Keita Project in Niger have been launched in the past, and have been able to locally revert damage done by desertification.

United States
Approximately one quarter of the United States is covered in non-protected forest. Nevertheless, areas in the US were subject to significant tree planting. In the 1800s people moving westward encountered the Great Plains – land with fertile soil, a growing population and a demand for timber but with few trees to supply it. So tree planting was encouraged along homesteads. Arbor Day was founded in 1872 by Julius Sterling Morton in Nebraska City, Nebraska. By the 1930s the Dust Bowl environmental disaster signified a reason for significant new tree cover. Public works programs under the New Deal saw the planting of 18,000 miles of windbreaks stretching from North Dakota to Texas to fight soil erosion (see Great Plains Shelterbelt).

Benefits 
Afforestation boasts many climate-related benefits. Several new studies suggest that forests attract rain, which may explain why drought is occurring more frequently in certain parts of the world such as western Africa, where trees are more sparse. A 2017 study gives the first observational evidence that the southern Amazon rainforest triggers its own rainy season using water vapor from plant leaves, which then forms clouds above it. These findings help explain why deforestation in this region is linked with reduced rainfall. A 2009 study hypothesizes that forest cover plays a much greater role in determining rainfall than previously recognized. It explains how forested regions generate large-scale flows in atmospheric water vapor and further underscores the benefit of afforestation in currently barren regions of the world.

Afforestation helps to slow down global warming by reducing  in the atmosphere and introducing more O2. Trees are carbon sinks that remove  from the atmosphere via photosynthesis and convert it into biomass.

Afforestation provides other environmental benefits, including increasing the soil quality and organic carbon levels in the soil, avoiding erosion and desertification.

Criticism

Afforestation in grasslands 
Tree-planting campaigns are criticised for sometimes targeting areas where forests would not naturally occur, such as grassland and savanna biomes. Carbon sequestration forecasts of afforestation programmes often insufficiently consider possible carbon reductions in soils as well as slowing tree growth over time.

Impact on biodiversity 
Afforestation can negatively affect biodiversity through increasing fragmentation and edge effects for the habitat remaining outside the planted area. New forest plantations can introduce generalist predators that would otherwise not be found in open habitat into the covered area, which could detrimentally increase predation rates on the native species of the area. A study by scientists at the British Trust for Ornithology into the decline of British populations of Eurasian curlew found that afforestation had impacted curlew populations through fragmentation of their naturally open grassland habitats and increases in generalist predators.

Surface albedo 
Questions have also been raised in the scientific community regarding how global afforestation could affect the surface albedo of Earth. The canopy cover of mature trees could make the surface albedo darker, which causes more heat to be absorbed, potentially raising the temperature of the planet. This is particularly relevant in parts of the world with high levels of snow cover, due to the more significant difference in albedo between highly reflective white snow and more darker forest cover which absorbs more solar radiation.

See also

 Agroforestry
 Agricultural robots
 Buffer strip
 CarbonFix Standard
 Deforestation
 Deforestation and climate change
 Desertification
 Forest dynamics
 Forestry
 Great Plains Shelterbelt
 Groasis Waterboxx
 International Year of Forests
 Japanese afforestation
 One Earth Climate Model
 Proforestation
 Reforestation
 Sand fence
 Seawater greenhouse
 Silviculture
 The Man Who Planted Trees
 Tubestock
 Windbreak

Sources

References

Notes

Bibliography
 Buendia C, Batalla RJ, Sabater S, Palau A, Marce R. (2016). Runoff Trends Driven by Climate and Afforestation in a Pyrenean Basin. Land Degradation & Development. 
 Buendia C, Bussi G, Tuset J, Vericat D, Sabater S, Palau A, Batalla RJ. (2016). Effects of afforestation on runoff and sediment load in an upland Mediterranean catchment. Science of the Total Environment. 
 Cattaneo, Andrea (2002) Balancing Agricultural Development and Deforestation in the Brazilian Amazon, Int Food Policy Res Inst IFPRI, 146 pages  
 Heil, Gerrit W., Bart Muys and Karin Hansen (2007) Environmental Effects of Afforestation in North-Western Europe, Springer, 320 pages  
 Halldorsson G., Oddsdottir, ES and Sigurdsson BD (2008) AFFORNORD Effects of Afforestation on Ecosystems, Landscape and Rural Development, TemaNord 2008:562, 120 pages  
 Halldorsson G., Oddsdottir, ES and Eggertsson O (2007) Effects of Afforestation on Ecosystems, Landscape and Rural Development. Proceedings of the AFFORNORD conference, Reykholt, Iceland, June 18–22, 2005, TemaNord 2007:508, 343pages  
 McBeath, Gerald A., and Tse-Kang Leng (2006) Governance of Biodiversity Conservation in China and Taiwan, Edward Elgar Publishing, 242 pages  
 Stanturf, John A. and Palle Madsen (2004) Restoration of Boreal and Temperate Forests, CRC Press, 569 pages  
 Wilson, E. O. (2002) The Future of Life, Vintage

External links
 Raunet Michel and Naudin Krishna, 2006. Combating desertification through direct seeding mulch-based cropping systems (DMC). Les dossiers thématiques du CSFD. Issue 4. 40 pp.
Top 10 Golden Rules of Reforestation
THE POTENTIAL OF LARGE- SCALE AFFORESTATION OF DRYLANDS FOR CLIMATE CHANGE MITIGATION

Deforestation
Desert greening
Forest ecology
Habitat management equipment and methods
Reforestation
Carbon dioxide removal